Ronnie Bedford (June 2, 1931 – December 20, 2014) was an American jazz drummer and professor. Born in Bridgeport, Connecticut, Bedford was one of the founders of the Yellowstone Jazz Festival held annually in Cody, Wyoming, and was the recipient of the 1993 Wyoming Governor's Award for the Arts.  In 1993 he released a self-published CD, Tour de West.  He later produced three more albums for Progressive Records.  Bedford lived in Powell, Wyoming and taught percussion at Northwest College.

Discography

As leader
Just Friends (Progressive, 1993)
Triplicity (Progressive, 1998)
QuaDRUMvirate (Progressive, 1999)

As sideman 
With Benny Carter
 My Kind of Trouble (Pablo, 1989)
 Over the Rainbow (MusicMasters, 1989)

With Benny Carter
Over the Rainbow (MusicMasters, 1989)

With Arnett Cobb
 Funky Butt (Progressive, 1980)

With Chris Connor
 Sweet and Swinging (Progressive, 1978)

With Buddy DeFranco
 Like Someone in Love (Progressive, 1989)

With Don Friedman
 Invitation (Progressive, 1993) – recorded in 1978
 Jazz Dancing (Solid, 2016) – recorded in 1977

With Hank Jones
Arigato (Progressive, 1976)
With Rod Levitt
The Dynamic Sound Patterns (Riverside, 1963)
With Pee Wee Russell
Ask Me Now! (Impulse!, 1963)
With Derek Smith
Plays Jerome Kern (Progressive, 1980)
With Chuck Wayne
Morning Mist (Prestige, 1965)

Main source:

References

External links
 

1931 births
2014 deaths
American jazz drummers
Musicians from Wyoming
Place of birth missing
People from Powell, Wyoming